The Unchangeability or Immutability of God is an attribute that "God is unchanging in his character, will, and covenant promises."

The Westminster Shorter Catechism says that "[God] is a spirit, whose being, wisdom, power, holiness, justice, goodness, and truth are infinite, eternal, and unchangeable." Those things do not change. A number of Scriptures attest to this idea (such as Num. 23:19; 1 Sam. 15:29; Ps. 102:26; Mal. 3:6; 2 Tim. 2:13; Heb. 6:17–18; Jam. 1:17) 

God's immutability defines all God's other attributes: God is immutably wise, merciful, good, and gracious: Primarily, God is almighty/omnipotent (having all power), God is omnipresent (present everywhere), God is omniscient (knows everything), eternally and immutably so. Infiniteness and immutability in God are mutually supportive and imply each other. An infinite and changing God is inconceivable; indeed, it is a contradiction in definition.

Ancient Roots
The Old Testament includes several verses that support God's immutability. This includes verses such as "I, the Lord, do not change." (Malachi 3:6, NIV) or the more limited "He who is the Glory of Israel does not lie or change his mind; for he is not a human being, that he should change his mind.” (1 Samuel 15:29, NIV), implying that God does not change his mind.

Likewise, Ancient Greek philosophers advocated the view that God does not change. In his Republic, Plato dismisses the idea found in Greek myth and poetry that the gods can change in any way. Rather, Plato argues, God is perfect and cannot and does not change. For if a god is already the best possible in these respects, a god cannot change for the better. But being perfect includes being immune to change for the worse — too powerful to have it imposed without permission and too good to permit it. Thus a god cannot improve or deteriorate, making any change within God impossible. Following Plato, the idea that God is perfect and cannot change became widely accepted among philosophers. Aristotle also accepted the idea that God was perfect and unchanging and it became a central point of his philosophy, which would influence philosophers and theologians throughout the Middle Ages.

Philo, who combined Greek philosophical thought with Biblical exegesis in his works, argues in On the Unchangeableness of God that God is perfect, beyond all space and time and creator of both, and is therefore not subject to any emotions or change of any kind. The Biblical verses which seem to say that God changes his mind or is subject to emotions and moods are called anthropopathisms which assigns human emotions/feeling to God that He does not actually possess.  Anthropopathisms are to assist finite human beings in better understanding the infiniteness of God's character.

Criticism
While most Christians believe that there are aspects of God that do not change, opponents believe that the benevolence of God is often expressed through his willingness to change his promised course of action which implies a certain level of mutability.  (See Exodus 32:14 and Numbers 14:12-20; Jonah 3:10; Amos 7:3-9; Jeremiah 26:3)

For example, when God was giving the law and the Ten Commandments to Moses, he was gone for so long that Aaron, his brother the high priest, and the people, thought that he was dead or that something had happened, and the people asked Aaron to build them the Golden Calf. On that occasion, and during another when the people rebel against Moses and God, God threatens to destroy the people and make a nation out of Moses alone, but Moses reminds God of the promise he made to Abraham to make Israel a great nation, and the earlier promise to Noah not to wipe out all human beings ever again until time's end. God relents, but says that all those who participated will not be allowed to enter Canaan, the promised land.

It could be said that God knows beforehand all the possible steps each creature – i.e., which steps each human could take at any given moment, whether good or bad, and God also knows beforehand from eternity what he will or will not ultimately do in any given situation, knowing that sometimes he will say he is going to do something worse – and then doing either a less negative response or nothing at all. This allows God to exhibit a unique form of free will, and to show his mercy and forgiveness and holiness – qualities God values.

See also
 Christian theology

References

Attributes of God in Christian theology
Christian terminology